Taka Ledougou-Koko is a village in the Bérégadougou Department of Comoé Province in south-western Burkina Faso. The village has a population of 931.

References

Populated places in the Cascades Region
Comoé Province